All Eyes may refer to:

"All Eyez", 2016 song by The Game featuring Jeremih
"All Eyes on You", 2015 song by American hip hop recording artist Meek Mill featuring Chris Brown and Nicki Minaj
 All Eyes on Me (disambiguation)
 All Eyez (disambiguation)